Alan Reynolds (born 26 October 1960) is a Welsh professional darts player who played in Professional Darts Corporation (PDC) events.

Reynolds played in the 2005 PDC World Championship but lost to Mark Landers in the last 48.

World Championship performances

PDC
 2005: Last 48 (lost to Mark Landers 2–3)

References

External links

1960 births
Living people
Welsh darts players
Professional Darts Corporation former pro tour players